Pennsylvania Route 764 (PA 764) is a north–south state highway in Blair County in the U.S. state of Pennsylvania. The route is one of many major north–south thoroughfares in Altoona. South of the city near Duncansville, a suburb of Altoona, it terminates at an interchange with U.S. Route 22 (US 22). The northern terminus is located several miles north of Altoona east of Pinecroft, at an interchange with Interstate 99 (I-99) and US 220, at exit 39.

Route description

PA 764 begins in Allegheny Township at an interchange with US 22, south of downtown Altoona. The junction is composed of two trumpet-style interchanges connecting PA 764 with the US 22 freeway. To the south of the interchange, the surface road continues as US 22 to Duncansville.

From there, PA 764 is aligned north–south through the southern Altoona suburbs and small hamlets, running parallel to and west of I-99/US 220. Upon entering the city, PA 764 becomes 6th Avenue and begins intersecting numbered streets, starting with 58th Street and decreasing to lower numbers as one moves north. Approaching the downtown area, PA 764 splits into the 6th and 7th Avenue one-way pair and enters the commercial district of Altoona. 6th Avenue is mostly the boundary between the downtown and Dutch Hill (except near the school zones). The two pairs intersect Union Avenue (PA 36) near the heart of the city, around the edge of the downtown.

In the northern section of the city, the two pairs merge and turn right onto Lloyd Street, while Sixth Avenue Road continues to the north. PA 764 runs east on Lloyd Street for eight blocks, then turns north to become Walton Avenue. Outside of Altoona, PA 764 merges onto US 220 Business, to begin a long overlap with the route on Pleasant Valley Boulevard.

In Antis Township, east of Pinecroft, PA 764 leaves US 220 BUS to turn east. A short distance east of the overlap, PA 764 terminates at an interchange with I-99/US 220, at exit 39.

History
Throughout much of its history, PA 764 was US 220 north of Altoona. This designation was in place from the 1940s to the 1990s. Before the bill was passed to build the highway that now carries U.S. 220 from Duncansville to Altoona, the current PA 764 was designated as PA 264, following the decommission of original PA 64.

Major intersections

See also

References

External links

 Pennsylvania Highways: PA 764

764
Transportation in Blair County, Pennsylvania
U.S. Route 220